Endless Twilight of Codependent Love is the seventh album by the Icelandic post-metal band Sólstafir. It was released on November 6, 2020 through the record label Season of Mist, and streamed two days early on YouTube. The album cover is a reproduction of a painting by Johann Baptist Zwecker of the Lady of the Mountain, the female personification of Iceland. 

Metal Hammer named it as the 34th best metal album of 2020.

Track listing

Credits

Personnel

Sólstafir 
 Aðalbjörn Tryggvason – guitar, vocals
 Sæþór M. Sæþórsson – guitar
 Svavar Austmann – bass
 Hallgrímur J. Hallgrímsson – drums, backing vocals

Production 
 Birgir Jón Birgirsson – production

Charts

References 

2020 albums
Season of Mist albums
Sólstafir albums